Copulative may refer to:

 Copula (linguistics), a part of speech
 Copulation (zoology), the union of the sex organs of two sexually reproducing animals for insemination and subsequent internal fertilization